Rukhshana Media is an Afghan women's media organisation created in November 2020 in memory of Rukhshana, a young woman stoned to death in 2015 in Ghor Province for having fled with a lover after a forced marriage.

Creation
Rukhshana Media was created in November 2020 by Zahra Joya to focus on stories by and about Afghan women. The name "Rukhshana" refers to a teenager from Ghor Province called Rukhshana who was accused of adultery and stoned to death in 2015. A video of the lapidation circulated widely, gaining widespread international attention. Rukhshana's killing was one of several cases of honour killings of women fleeing forced marriages or of women rape victims in Ghor Province in the mid 2010s.

Themes
Themes published by Rukhshana Media include "women's reproductive health, domestic and sexual violence, and gender discrimination". During the 2021 Taliban offensive, Rukhshana Media reported on expectations that the Taliban would violate women's rights and that divorced women remaining single expected to be at risk from the Taliban. In July 2021, Rukhshana Media together with Time and The Fuller Project reported on school being forbidden to "thousands" of girls in Taliban-occupied areas of Afghanistan, with teachers at girls' schools receiving death threats and being refused authorisation to teach. According to the report, only girls up to the age of 12 were allowed to attend school, they were required to wear niqābs or burqas, and the number of hours teaching the Quran was increased.

Development
On 15 August 2021, the date of the Fall of Kabul, Rukhshana Media announced its plans to launch a version of its news website in English, in addition to its existing Dari reports.

Security risks
During the 2021 Taliban offensive, Rukhshana Media journalists were at risk, due to the high risk of assassination of female journalists. Columbia Journalism Review described risks to Afghan journalists in general and women journalists in particular as remaining high following the 15 August 2021 fall of Kabul to Taliban forces.

See also
BaanoTV (TV channel)

References

External links

News media in Afghanistan
Organizations established in 2020
2020 establishments in Asia